Royal Alliance (AR) is a French political party dedicated to the restoration of the monarchy in France and to increasing debate about the monarchy amongst the general public. The party was established in 2001 using the French symbol of the Fleur-de-lis as a logo, which was originally used by the monarchy in pre-revolutionary France. The party is also marked by its euroscepticism and seeks to re-establish a constitutional monarchy as an institution that identifies France within European culture.

Founding

The party was established in 2001 by Yves-Marie Adeline as a popular channel seeking to connect with the public at large in order to widen the debate in France about monarchy, which is not a commonly discussed topic, and to encourage people to see the benefits of constitutional monarchy.

Ideology and policy

The party has established itself with the aim of "encouraging France to prepare her future within her institutions," i.e., the institution of monarchy. The party believes in the restoration of a monarchy as a constitutional body, it does not specify any dynasty that it prefers. The party cites cultural identity within Europe as one reason for which to re-establish monarchy, and is thus markedly Eurosceptic, describing the European Union as a body of European states with common objectives and not as a political union or superstate.

Organisation
The party is split into regional groupings, with party activists in each region responsible for the promotion of the party and its cause.

References

External links
Official web site

Monarchist parties in France
Conservative parties in France
Political parties established in 2001
Far-right politics in France
Reactionary
2001 establishments in France